The women's pole vault event at the 2006 World Junior Championships in Athletics was held in Beijing, China, at Chaoyang Sports Centre on 16 and 18 August.

Medalists

Results

Final
18 August

Qualifications
16 August

Group A

Group B

Participation
According to an unofficial count, 25 athletes from 18 countries participated in the event.

References

Pole vault
Pole vault at the World Athletics U20 Championships